Managing the Professional Service Firm is a book by David H. Maister, a Harvard Business School professor and professional service firm consultant. The book is a compilation of 32 articles written over the preceding ten years and covers topics from strategy to profitability, marketing to motivating employees.

References

1997 non-fiction books
Business books
Simon & Schuster books